"Love Needs a Holiday" is a song originally recorded by American country artist Reba McEntire. The track was composed by Tony Haselden and Tim Mensy. It was released as a single in January 2006 via MCA Nashville and charted on the American country songs survey. It was the second and final single release from McEntire's 2005 album Reba 1's.

Background and content
Reba McEntire returned from a temporarily recording hiatus in 2003 with the release of the commercially-successful album Room to Breathe. Following the disc, McEntire released a string of singles with her recording label during the mid 2000s. This included Reba 1's, which included the new recording "Love Needs a Holiday". The track was composed by Tony Haselden and Tim Mensy. McEntire recorded the song in 2005. It was co-produced by Buddy Cannon, along with McEntire herself serving as co-producer. The song was described by Roughstock as "an up-tempo" single when reviewing a separate album of McEntire's.

Release and chart performance
"Love Needs a Holiday" was first released on McEntire's 2005 compilation titled Reba 1's. The album featured two new recordings, which included "Love Needs a Holiday". In his review of Reba 1's, Dan MacIntosh of Country Standard Time commented that the song "treats romantic doldrums with just a dash of humor." On January 10, 2006, "Love Needs a Holiday" was spawned as the album's second single. It was issued as a compact disc single on MCA Nashville Records. The single spent one week on the Billboard Hot Country Songs chart, peaking at number 60 in February 2006. It was McEntire's lowest-charting single since 1977. A music video was also released following the single, which was directed by Trey Fanjoy.

Track listing
CD single
 "Love Needs a Holiday" – 3:12

Charts

References

2005 songs
2006 singles
Reba McEntire songs
Song recordings produced by Buddy Cannon
MCA Nashville Records singles
Songs written by Tony Haselden
Songs written by Tim Menzies